"Ku Lo Sa" is a song by Nigerian singer Oxlade. It was released on 10 June 2022 through Troniq Music and Epic Records for ColorsxStudios. Following its release, a live-performing video was released on Colors YouTube channel, which has received over 54 million YouTube streams as of 27 December 2022. 
A remix along with Cuban-American singer Camila Cabello was released on 9 December 2022 with new verses from Cabello.

Accolades

Charts

Weekly charts

Year-end charts

Certifications

References

2022 singles
2022 songs
Epic Records singles
Oxlade (singer) songs
Camila Cabello songs